Lynwood can refer to:

Places
Australia
 Lynwood, New South Wales
 Lynwood, Western Australia, a suburb of Perth, Western Australia
United States
 Lynwood, California
 Lynwood Vikings, a Deputy Gang in Los Angeles
 Lynwood, Illinois
 Lynwood, Mississippi
 Lynwood Park, a district of Brookhaven, Georgia, United States

Other uses
 Straight Outta Lynwood, 2006 album by Weird Al Yankovic

See also
Lynnwood (disambiguation)
Linwood (disambiguation)
Linnwood (disambiguation)